George Kelly (July 31, 1915 – May 24, 1998) was an American jazz tenor saxophonist and arranger born in Miami, Florida. Panama Francis was a sideman in Kelly's band in the 1930s; Kelly played in Francis's Savoy Sultans band in the 1970s, and had played in Al Cooper's band of the same name in the 1940s. Additionally, Kelly led his own bands and worked with other jazz artists such as Tiny Grimes, Rex Stewart and Cozy Cole.

"Kelly had a strong tenor tone that looked back towards the swing era while he was clearly aware of later developments."

Discography

As leader/co-leader
Stealing Apples (Dharma)
Slide Kelly Slide/In the Mood (1976, Jazz Session)
George Kelly in Cimiez (1979, Black & Blue)
Fine and Dandy (1982, Barron)
Cotton Club (1983)
George Kelly Plays Don Redman (1984, Stash)
Groove Move (1994, Jazzpoint)

As sideman
With Rex Stewart
Rendezvous with Rex (Felsted, 1958)

References

1915 births
1998 deaths
20th-century American male musicians
20th-century American saxophonists
American jazz saxophonists
American male saxophonists
Harlem Blues and Jazz Band members
Jazz tenor saxophonists
American male jazz musicians
Savoy Sultans members
Black & Blue Records artists
Musicians from Miami